This is a list of diplomatic missions of the Bahamas. The Bahamas has a very small number of diplomatic missions, as listed below (excluding honorary consulates).

America

 Ottawa (High Commission)

 Havana (Embassy)

 Port-au-Prince (Embassy)

 Washington, D.C. (Embassy)
 Atlanta (Consulate-General)
 Miami (Consulate-General)
 New York (Consulate-General)

Asia

 Beijing (Embassy)

Europe

 Brussels (Embassy)

 London (High Commission)

Multilateral organisations
 
New York (Permanent Mission)
 
Washington, D.C. (Permanent Mission)

Gallery

See also
 Foreign relations of the Bahamas

References
 Ministry of Foreign Affairs of the Commonwealth of the Bahamas

 
Bahamas
Diplomatic missions